A Sugar acid or acidic sugar is a monosaccharide with a carboxyl group at one end or both ends of its chain.

Main classes of sugar acids include:
 Aldonic acids, in which the aldehyde group (−CHO) located at the initial end (position 1) of an aldose is oxidized.
 Ulosonic acids, in which the −CH2(OH) group at the initial end of a 2-ketose is oxidized creating an α-ketoacid.
 Uronic acids, in which the −CH2(OH) group at the terminal end of an aldose or ketose is oxidized.
 Aldaric acids, in which both ends (−CHO and −CH2(OH)) of an aldose are oxidized.

Examples
Examples of sugar acids include:
 Aldonic acids
 Glyceric acid (3C)
 Xylonic acid (5C)
 Gluconic acid (6C)
 Ascorbic acid (6C, unsaturated lactone)
 Ulosonic acids
 Neuraminic acid (5-amino-3,5-dideoxy-D-glycero-D-galacto-non-2-ulosonic acid)
 Ketodeoxyoctulosonic acid (KDO or 3-deoxy-D-manno-oct-2-ulosonic acid)
 Uronic acids
 Glucuronic acid (6C)
 Galacturonic acid (6C)
 Iduronic acid (6C)
 Aldaric acids
 Tartaric acid (4C)
 meso-Galactaric acid (Mucic acid) (6C)
 D-Glucaric acid (Saccharic acid) (6C)

References

External links